Heřmánkovice is a municipality and village in Náchod District in the Hradec Králové Region of the Czech Republic. It has about 500 inhabitants. It is located on the border with Poland.

Administrative parts
The village of Janovičky is an administrative part of Heřmánkovice.

References

Villages in Náchod District